Alumni Stadium is the on-campus soccer stadium in natural grass at the University of Notre Dame in Notre Dame, Indiana. The current tenants are the Notre Dame Fighting Irish men's & women's soccer teams. 
The 3,007 -seat stadium was built between April 26, 2008, and September 1, 2009. It was first used on September 4, 2009, when the women's team played  North Carolina and the men's team played Wake Forest.  Capacity is increased via a grass berm on the east end of the ground. Its largest crowd was 3,511 guests to assist the women's team versus Tulsa on September 2, 2011. It has hosted NCAA tournament games.

See also
Notre Dame Fighting Irish
Notre Dame Fighting Irish men's soccer
Notre Dame Fighting Irish women's soccer

References

College soccer venues in the United States
Notre Dame Fighting Irish men's soccer venues
Notre Dame Fighting Irish women's soccer venues
Soccer venues in Indiana
Sports venues in South Bend, Indiana
University of Notre Dame buildings and structures
2009 establishments in Indiana
Sports venues completed in 2009
University and college buildings completed in 2009